Clypeastericola clypeastericola is a species of sea snail, a marine gastropod mollusk in the family Eulimidae. This species is one of two known species to exist within the genus, Clypeastericola, the other species is known as Clypeastericola natalensis.

Distribution

This species occurs in the following locations:

 Sea of Japan

References

External links
 To World Register of Marine Species

Eulimidae
Gastropods described in 1976